Adem Ibrahim is the former Ethiopian Minister of Health.

References

Year of birth missing (living people)
Living people
Ethiopian politicians